James Joseph may refer to:
James A. Joseph (1935–2023), American diplomat
James R. Joseph, Pennsylvania Adjutant General of Military and Veterans Affairs
James Joseph (American football) (born 1967), American football running back
James Joseph (cyclist) (born 1957), Guyanese cyclist
James Joseph (footballer)
James Joseph (curler) (born 1962), American wheelchair curler, 2006, 2010 and 2014 Paralympian
Jamie Joseph (born 1969), rugby union player
Jim Joseph, see United States Football League
Jimmy Jean-Joseph (born 1972), French athlete

See also

Joseph James (disambiguation)